Sybra is a genus of beetles in the family Cerambycidae, containing the following species:

Subgenus
subgenus Cristosybra
 Sybra bifasciculosa Breuning, 1956
 Sybra cristipennis Breuning, 1950

subgenus Fasciculosybra
 Sybra ephippiata (Fairmaire, 1896)

subgenus Microzotale
 Sybra distincta Takakuwa, 1984
 Sybra uenoi (Hayashi, 1956)

subgenus Pilosybra
 Sybra pallens Breuning, 1942

subgenus Pseudathelais
 Sybra concolor Breuning, 1982
 Sybra longicollis Breuning, 1968
 Sybra paralongicollis Breuning, 1968

subgenus Sybra
 Sybra dimidiata (Dillon & Dillon, 1952)
 Sybra eson (Dillon & Dillon, 1952)
 Sybra puella (Dillon & Dillon, 1952)
 Sybra sapho (Dillon & Dillon, 1952)
 Sybra syces (Dillon & Dillon, 1952)
 Sybra acuta (Pascoe, 1863)
 Sybra acutipennis Breuning, 1951
 Sybra aenescens Breuning, 1939
 Sybra aequabilis Breuning, 1938
 Sybra affinis Breuning, 1939
 Sybra albescens Breuning, 1953
 Sybra albisparsa Breuning, 1939
 Sybra albolineata Breuning, 1939
 Sybra albomaculata Breuning, 1939
 Sybra albopunctata Breuning, 1939
 Sybra alboscutellaris (Heller, 1924)
 Sybra albostictica Breuning, 1960
 Sybra albostictipennis Breuning, 1963
 Sybra albosuturalis Breuning, 1939
 Sybra albovariegata Breuning, 1939
 Sybra albovittata Breuning, 1943
 Sybra alternans (Wiedemann, 1823)
 Sybra alternata Breuning, 1939
 Sybra ambigua Breuning, 1939
 Sybra anatahana Gressitt, 1956
 Sybra andamanensis Breuning, 1939
 Sybra andamanica Breuning, 1939
 Sybra annulata (Heller, 1924)
 Sybra apicalis Breuning, 1939
 Sybra apicefusca Breuning, 1950
 Sybra apicemaculata Breuning, 1939
 Sybra apiceochreomaculata Breuning, 1964
 Sybra apicesignata Breuning & de Jong, 1941
 Sybra apicespinosa Breuning, 1942
 Sybra apicevittata Breuning, 1939   
 Sybra apomecynoides Breuning, 1939
 Sybra approximata Breuning, 1939
 Sybra arator Pascoe, 1865
 Sybra arcifera Pascoe, 1865
 Sybra auberti Breuning, 1950
 Sybra baculina Bates, 1866
 Sybra baloghi Breuning, 1975
 Sybra basialbofasciata Hayashi, 1972
 Sybra basicristata Breuning, 1939
 Sybra basilana Breuning, 1939
 Sybra basimaculata (Heller, 1924)
 Sybra basirufa Breuning, 1970
 Sybra benjamini Breuning, 1939
 Sybra bialbomaculata Breuning, 1953
 Sybra biangulata (Fairmaire, 1893)
 Sybra biapicata (Gahan, 1907)
 Sybra biatrosignata Aurivillius, 1927
 Sybra bicristata Breuning, 1939
 Sybra bicristipennis Breuning, 1961
 Sybra biflavoguttata Breuning, 1953
 Sybra bifuscomaculata Breuning, 1960
 Sybra bifuscoplagiata Breuning, 1940
 Sybra bifuscoplagiatipennis Breuning, 1966
 Sybra bifuscopunctata Breuning, 1960
 Sybra biguttata Aurivillius, 1927
 Sybra biguttula Breuning, 1964
 Sybra bimaculata Breuning, 1939
 Sybra binigromaculata Breuning, 1973
 Sybra binotata Gahan, 1907
 Sybra biochreopunctipennis Breuning, 1966
 Sybra bioculata Pic, 1925
 Sybra bipartita Breuning, 1939
 Sybra bipunctata (Heller, 1924)
 Sybra bipunctulata Breuning, 1966
 Sybra bisignata Schwarzer, 1931
 Sybra bisignatoides Breuning, 1980
 Sybra borchmanni Breuning, 1957
 Sybra borneotica Breuning, 1939
 Sybra botelensis Breuning & Ohbayashi, 1966
 Sybra breuningi Gressitt, 1940
 Sybra brevelineata (Pic, 1926)
 Sybra brunnescens Breuning, 1950
 Sybra buruensis Breuning, 1939
 Sybra cana Breuning, 1939
 Sybra canoides Breuning, 1980
 Sybra carinata Breuning, 1939
 Sybra carinipennis Breuning, 1956
 Sybra catalana Gressitt, 1956
 Sybra catopa Dillon & Dillon, 1952
 Sybra chaffanjoni Breuning, 1969 
 Sybra chamorro Gressitt, 1956
 Sybra cinerascens Breuning, 1940
 Sybra cinerea Aurivillius, 1927
 Sybra citrina Breuning, 1950
 Sybra clara Breuning, 1939
 Sybra collaris Pascoe, 1865
 Sybra conicollis Aurivillius, 1927
 Sybra connexa Pascoe, 1865
 Sybra consobrina Gressitt, 1956
 Sybra consputa Pascoe, 1865
 Sybra constricticollis Aurivillius, 1927
 Sybra contigua Pascoe, 1865
 Sybra continentalis Breuning, 1942
 Sybra convexa Gressitt, 1956
 Sybra coomani Breuning, 1939
 Sybra crassepuncta Breuning, 1938
 Sybra cretifera Pascoe, 1865
 Sybra curvatosignata Breuning & de Jong, 1941
 Sybra cylindraceoides Breuning, 1970
 Sybra dawsoni Breuning, 1970
 Sybra demarzi Breuning, 1963
 Sybra densemarmorata Breuning, 1942
 Sybra densepunctata Breuning, 1940
 Sybra densestictica Breuning, 1939
 Sybra deserta (Heller, 1924)
 Sybra desueta Pascoe, 1865
 Sybra devota Pascoe, 1865
 Sybra discomaculata Breuning, 1950
 Sybra dohertyi Breuning, 1960
 Sybra donckieri Breuning, 1939
 Sybra dorsata (Fairmaire, 1881)
 Sybra dorsatoides Breuning, 1957
 Sybra drescheri Fisher, 1936
 Sybra dunni Breuning, 1976
 Sybra egregia Pascoe, 1865
 Sybra elongatissima Breuning, 1939
 Sybra elongatula Breuning, 1939
 Sybra emarginata Gressitt, 1956
 Sybra epilystoides Breuning & de Jong, 1941
 Sybra erratica Pascoe, 1865
 Sybra eumilis (Dillon & Dillon, 1952)
 Sybra excavatipennis Breuning, 1960
 Sybra fauveli (Théry, 1897)
 Sybra femoralis Breuning, 1940
 Sybra fervida Pascoe, 1865
 Sybra filiformis Breuning, 1939
 Sybra flava Breuning, 1939
 Sybra flavoapicalis Breuning, 1939
 Sybra flavoguttata Aurivillius, 1927
 Sybra flavoides Breuning, 1964   
 Sybra flavolineata Breuning, 1942
 Sybra flavomaculata Breuning, 1939
 Sybra flavomarmorata Breuning, 1942
 Sybra flavostictica Breuning, 1942
 Sybra flavostriata Hayashi, 1968   
 Sybra fortipes Breuning, 1964
 Sybra fortiscapa Breuning, 1942
 Sybra frasersi Breuning, 1976
 Sybra freyi Breuning, 1957
 Sybra fulvoapicalis (Dillon & Dillon, 1952)
 Sybra furtiva Pascoe, 1865
 Sybra fusca Breuning, 1970
 Sybra fuscoapicalis Breuning, 1939
 Sybra fuscoapicaloides Breuning, 1964
 Sybra fuscofasciata Breuning, 1939
 Sybra fuscofasciatoides Breuning, 1964
 Sybra fuscolateralipennis Breuning, 1964
 Sybra fuscolateralis Breuning, 1939
 Sybra fuscomarmorata Breuning, 1939
 Sybra fuscopicta Breuning, 1940
 Sybra fuscosternalis Breuning, 1942
 Sybra fuscosuturalis Breuning, 1939
 Sybra fuscotriangularis Breuning, 1939
 Sybra fuscovitticollis Breuning, 1970
 Sybra fuscovittipennis Breuning, 1975
 Sybra geminata (Klug, 1833)
 Sybra geminatoides Breuning, 1940
 Sybra grisea Breuning, 1939
 Sybra griseola Breuning, 1939
 Sybra griseopubescens Breuning, 1956
 Sybra grisescens Breuning, 1939
 Sybra guamensis Breuning, 1976
 Sybra guttula Breuning, 1939
 Sybra hebridarum Breuning, 1939
 Sybra helleri (Schwarzer, 1931)
 Sybra holoflavogrisea Breuning, 1973
 Sybra humeralis Aurivillius, 1927
 Sybra humerosa Breuning, 1939
 Sybra iconica Pascoe, 1865
 Sybra iconicoides Breuning, 1975
 Sybra ignobilis Breuning, 1942
 Sybra inanis Pascoe, 1865
 Sybra incana (Pascoe, 1859)
 Sybra incaniformis Breuning, 1954
 Sybra incivilis (Pascoe, 1863)
 Sybra indistincta Breuning, 1939
 Sybra inermis (Pic, 1944)
 Sybra internata Pascoe, 1865
 Sybra intorta Breuning, 1939
 Sybra ishigakii Breuning & Ohbayashi, 1964
 Sybra jaguarita Breuning, 1942
 Sybra javana Breuning, 1939
 Sybra javanica Breuning, 1939
 Sybra kaszabi Breuning, 1969
 Sybra kaszabiana Breuning, 1977
 Sybra kuri Ohbayashi & Hayashi, 1962
 Sybra laetula Breuning, 1939
 Sybra laevepunctata Breuning, 1939
 Sybra latefasciata Breuning, 1939
 Sybra lateralis Breuning, 1942
 Sybra laterialba Breuning, 1939
 Sybra laterifusca Breuning, 1939
 Sybra laterifuscipennis Breuning, 1964
 Sybra laterivitta Breuning, 1940
 Sybra latiuscula Aurivillius, 1927
 Sybra leucostictica Breuning, 1939
 Sybra lineata Pascoe, 1865
 Sybra lineatoides Breuning, 1973
 Sybra lineolata Breuning, 1942
 Sybra lingafelteri Skale & Weigel, 2012
 Sybra lobata Breuning, 1940
 Sybra lombokana Breuning, 1982
 Sybra longipes Breuning & de Jong, 1941
 Sybra longula Breuning, 1939
 Sybra luzonica Breuning, 1939
 Sybra maculiclunis Matsushita, 1931
 Sybra maculicollis Aurivillius, 1927
 Sybra maculithorax Breuning, 1939
 Sybra malaccensis Breuning, 1943
 Sybra marcida Pascoe, 1865
 Sybra marmorata Breuning, 1939
 Sybra marmorea Breuning, 1939
 Sybra mastersi Blackburn, 1894
 Sybra mausoni Breuning, 1969
 Sybra mediofasciata Breuning, 1939
 Sybra mediofusca Breuning, 1940
 Sybra medioguttata Breuning, 1942
 Sybra mediomaculata (Heller, 1924)
 Sybra mediovittata Breuning, 1939
 Sybra meeki Breuning, 1976
 Sybra mimalternans Breuning, 1970
 Sybra mimobaculina Breuning, 1970
 Sybra mimogeminata Breuning & Ohbayashi, 1964
 Sybra mindanaonis Breuning, 1939
 Sybra mindorensis Aurivillius, 1927
 Sybra minima Breuning, 1939
 Sybra minuta (Pic, 1927)
 Sybra minutior Breuning, 1939
 Sybra minutissima Breuning, 1943
 Sybra miscanthivola Makihara, 1977
 Sybra misella Breuning, 1939
 Sybra moczari Breuning, 1981
 Sybra modestior Breuning, 1960
 Sybra moorei (Gahan, 1894)
 Sybra multicoloripennis Breuning, 1971
 Sybra multiflavostriata Breuning, 1973
 Sybra multifuscofasciata Breuning, 1964
 Sybra murina Breuning, 1939
 Sybra narai Hayashi, 1976
 Sybra neopomeriana Breuning, 1939
 Sybra niasica Breuning, 1961
 Sybra nicobarica Breuning, 1939
 Sybra nigrobivittata Breuning, 1939
 Sybra nigrofasciata Aurivillius, 1927
 Sybra nigrolineata Breuning, 1942
 Sybra nigromarmorata Breuning, 1939
 Sybra nigroobliquelineata Breuning, 1943
 Sybra notatipennis Pascoe, 1865
 Sybra novaebritanniae Breuning, 1949
 Sybra nubila Pascoe, 1863
 Sybra obliquealbovittata Breuning, 1970
 Sybra obliquebifasciata Breuning, 1948
 Sybra obliquefasciata Breuning, 1938
 Sybra obliquelineata Breuning, 1942
 Sybra obliquelineaticollis Breuning, 1939
 Sybra obliquemaculata Breuning, 1942
 Sybra oblongipennis Breuning, 1939
 Sybra obtusipennis (Aurivillius, 1928)
 Sybra ochraceovittata Breuning, 1950
 Sybra ochreicollis Breuning, 1939
 Sybra ochreoguttata Breuning, 1939
 Sybra ochreosignata Breuning, 1939
 Sybra ochreosignatipennis Breuning, 1973
 Sybra ochreosparsa Breuning, 1939
 Sybra ochreosparsipennis Breuning, 1966
 Sybra ochreostictica Breuning, 1942
 Sybra ochreovittata Breuning, 1939
 Sybra ochreovittipennis Breuning, 1964
 Sybra odiosa Pascoe, 1865
 Sybra okinawana Breuning & Ohbayashi, 1970
 Sybra ordinata Bates, 1873
 Sybra oreora Gressitt, 1956
 Sybra ornata Breuning, 1939
 Sybra oshimana Breuning, 1958
 Sybra palavana Aurivillius, 1927
 Sybra palawanicola Breuning, 1960
 Sybra palliata Pascoe, 1865
 Sybra pallida Breuning, 1939
 Sybra pantherina Heller, 1915
 Sybra papuana Breuning, 1939
 Sybra parabisignatoides Breuning, 1980
 Sybra paraunicolor Breuning, 1975
 Sybra partefuscolateralis Breuning, 1964
 Sybra parteochreithorax Breuning, 1973 
 Sybra parva Breuning, 1939
 Sybra parvula Breuning, 1939
 Sybra pascoei Lameere, 1893
 Sybra patruoides Breuning, 1939
 Sybra peraffinis Breuning, 1942
 Sybra pfanneri Breuning, 1976
 Sybra philippinensis Breuning, 1939
 Sybra piceomacula Gressitt, 1951
 Sybra picta Breuning, 1939
 Sybra plagiata Aurivillius, 1927
 Sybra plagiatoides Breuning, 1950
 Sybra pluriguttata Breuning, 1942
 Sybra plurilineata Breuning, 1942
 Sybra poeciloptera Aurivillius, 1917
 Sybra ponapensis Blair, 1942
 Sybra porcellus Pascoe, 1865
 Sybra postalbomaculata Breuning, 1964
 Sybra postalbomarmorata Breuning, 1964
 Sybra postbasicristata Breuning, 1974
 Sybra posticalis (Pascoe, 1858)
 Sybra postmaculata Breuning, 1939
 Sybra postscutellaremaculata Breuning, 1964
 Sybra postscutellaris Breuning, 1939
 Sybra praemediomaculata Breuning, 1943
 Sybra praeusta (Pascoe, 1859)
 Sybra preapicefasciata Breuning, 1953
 Sybra preapicefuscofasciata Breuning, 1964
 Sybra preapicemaculata Breuning, 1939
 Sybra preapicetriangularis Breuning, 1973
 Sybra primaria Pascoe, 1865
 Sybra propinqua Breuning, 1939
 Sybra proxima Breuning, 1939
 Sybra proximata Breuning, 1942
 Sybra pseudirrorata Breuning, 1939
 Sybra pseudobityle (Heller, 1924)
 Sybra pseudogeminata Breuning, 1939
 Sybra pseudolineata Breuning, 1942
 Sybra pseudomarmorata Breuning, 1940
 Sybra pseudosignata Breuning, 1939
 Sybra pulla Breuning, 1939
 Sybra pulverea Pascoe, 1865
 Sybra pulvereoides Breuning, 1939
 Sybra punctata Fisher, 1925
 Sybra punctatostriata Bates, 1866
 Sybra puncticollis (Pascoe, 1865)
 Sybra punctulicollis Breuning, 1960
 Sybra pusilla Breuning, 1939
 Sybra quadriguttata Aurivillius, 1927
 Sybra quadrimaculata Breuning, 1939
 Sybra quadriplagiata Breuning, 1939
 Sybra quadripunctata Breuning, 1939
 Sybra quadristicta Breuning & de Jong, 1941
 Sybra quinquevittata Breuning, 1942
 Sybra refecta Pascoe, 1865
 Sybra regalis Breuning, 1939
 Sybra repudiosa Pascoe, 1865
 Sybra roepstorffi Breuning, 1964
 Sybra rosacea Breuning, 1942
 Sybra rouyeri Pic, 1938
 Sybra rufa Breuning, 1943
 Sybra rufula Pascoe, 1865
 Sybra samarana Breuning, 1970
 Sybra sarawakensis Breuning, 1939
 Sybra savioi Pic, 1925
 Sybra scalaris Breuning, 1939
 Sybra schultzeana Breuning, 1963
 Sybra schultzei Breuning, 1960
 Sybra schurmanni Breuning, 1983
 Sybra scutellata Fisher, 1925
 Sybra semilunaris Breuning, 1939
 Sybra separanda Aurivillius, 1927
 Sybra seriata (Pascoe, 1867)
 Sybra sexguttata Breuning, 1939
 Sybra sibuyana Aurivillius, 1927
 Sybra signata (Perroud, 1855)
 Sybra signatipennis Fisher, 1927
 Sybra signatoides Breuning, 1939
 Sybra sikkimensis Breuning, 1939
 Sybra simalurica Breuning & de Jong, 1941
 Sybra similis Breuning, 1939
 Sybra singaporensis Breuning, 1973
 Sybra solida Gahan, 1907
 Sybra spinipennis Breuning, 1954
 Sybra spinosa Breuning, 1939
 Sybra stigmatica (Pascoe, 1859)
 Sybra stramentosa Breuning, 1939
 Sybra strandi Breuning, 1939
 Sybra strandiella Breuning, 1942
 Sybra striatipennis Breuning, 1939
 Sybra striatopunctata Breuning, 1939
 Sybra strigina Pascoe, 1865
 Sybra subbiguttula Breuning, 1964
 Sybra subbiguttulata Breuning, 1964
 Sybra subclara Breuning, 1954
 Sybra subdentaticeps (Pic, 1926)
 Sybra subfortipes Breuning, 1964
 Sybra subgeminata Breuning, 1939
 Sybra submodesta Breuning, 1970
 Sybra subpalawana Breuning, 1969
 Sybra subproximatoides Breuning & Villiers, 1983
 Sybra subrotundipennis Breuning, 1961
 Sybra subtesselata Breuning, 1960
 Sybra subunicolor Breuning, 1974
 Sybra subuniformis Pic, 1926
 Sybra sulcata (Aurivillius, 1928)
 Sybra sumatrana Breuning, 1939
 Sybra sumatrensis Breuning, 1943
 Sybra suturemaculata Breuning, 1939
 Sybra tamborensis Breuning, 1956
 Sybra terminata Breuning, 1939
 Sybra ternatensis Breuning, 1942
 Sybra trapezoidalis Breuning, 1940
 Sybra triangulifera Breuning, 1938
 Sybra trianguliferoides Breuning & Villiers, 1983
 Sybra tricoloripennis Breuning, 1961
 Sybra triflavomaculata Breuning, 1975
 Sybra trilineata Pic, 1938
 Sybra turneri Breuning, 1958
 Sybra umbratica Pascoe, 1865
 Sybra unicolor Breuning, 1939  
 Sybra unicoloripennis Breuning, 1950
 Sybra unifasciata Fujimura, 1956
 Sybra uniformipennis Breuning, 1966
 Sybra uniformis Breuning, 1939
 Sybra uninigroguttata Breuning, 1973
 Sybra unipunctata Breuning, 1939
 Sybra vadoni Breuning, 1970
 Sybra varians Breuning, 1939
 Sybra variefasciata Breuning, 1973
 Sybra varipennis Breuning, 1942
 Sybra venosa Pascoe, 1865
 Sybra violata Pascoe, 1865
 Sybra violatoides Breuning, 1975
 Sybra vittaticollis Aurivillius, 1927
 Sybra vitticollis Breuning & de Jong, 1941
 Sybra yokoi Skale & Weigel, 2014
 Sybra zebra Breuning, 1942

subgenus Sybrodiboma
 Sybra mikurensis Hayashi, 1969
 Sybra subfasciata (Bates, 1884) 

subgenus incertae sedis
 Sybra herbacea Pascoe, 1865

References

 
Apomecynini
Cerambycidae genera